"You Belong to Me" is the second single recorded by British dance DJ Jake Williams under the name JX and featuring Shèna. It was released in April 1995 as a single. The song reached number 17 in the United Kingdom. It reached number-one in Spain, and number 15 in the Netherlands and Ireland. On the Eurochart Hot 100, the single peaked at number 25. Outside Europe, "You Belong to Me" peaked at number four in Australia and number six in Israel. A black-and-white music video was made to accompany the song.

Critical reception
British magazine Music Week wrote, "A Euro-pop/techno tune boasting the same furious breakbeats as predecessor Son Of A Gun but without the force to propel it quite as high in the charts."

Track listings
 CD maxi - Europe
 "You Belong to Me" (JX/Red Jerry Edit) - 4:03
 "You Belong to Me" (JX/Red Jerry Mix)	- 7:25
 "You Belong to Me" (No Respect Remix)	- 6:21
 "You Belong to Me" (Sil Remix) - 6:25

Charts

Weekly charts

Year-end charts

References

1995 songs
1995 singles
Jake Williams songs
Number-one singles in Spain
Black-and-white music videos